The Triassic–Jurassic (Tr-J) extinction event, often called the end-Triassic extinction, marks the boundary between the Triassic and Jurassic periods, and is one of the top five major extinction events of the Phanerozoic eon, profoundly affecting life on land and in the oceans. In the seas, the entire class of conodonts and 23–34% of marine genera disappeared.  On land, all archosauromorphs other than crocodylomorphs, pterosaurs, and dinosaurs became extinct; some of the groups which died out were previously abundant, such as aetosaurs, phytosaurs, and rauisuchids. Some remaining non-mammalian therapsids and many of the large temnospondyl amphibians had become extinct prior to the Jurassic as well. However, there is still much uncertainty regarding a connection between the Tr-J boundary and terrestrial vertebrates, due to a lack of terrestrial fossils from the Rhaetian (latest) stage of the Triassic. What was left fairly untouched were plants, crocodylomorphs, dinosaurs, pterosaurs and mammals; this allowed the dinosaurs, pterosaurs, and crocodylomorphs to become the dominant land animals for the next 135 million years.

Statistical analysis of marine losses at this time suggests that the decrease in diversity was caused more by a decrease in speciation than by an increase in extinctions. Nevertheless, a pronounced turnover in plant spores and a collapse of coral reef communities indicates that an ecological catastrophe did occur at the Triassic-Jurassic boundary. Older hypotheses on extinction have proposed that gradual climate or sea level change may be the culprit, or perhaps one or more asteroid strikes. However, the most well-supported and widely-held theory for the cause of the Tr-J extinction places the blame on the start of volcanic eruptions in the Central Atlantic Magmatic Province (CAMP). The CAMP is the most aerially extensive known large igneous province, with its flood basalts extending across parts of southwestern Europe, northwestern Africa, northeastern South America, and southeastern North America, and was responsible for outputting a high amount of carbon dioxide to induce profound global warming and ocean acidification.

Effects
This event vacated terrestrial ecological niches, allowing the dinosaurs to assume the dominant roles in the Jurassic period. This event happened in less than 10,000 years and occurred just before Pangaea started to break apart. In the area of Tübingen (Germany), a Triassic–Jurassic bonebed can be found, which is characteristic for this boundary.

Marine invertebrates 
The Triassic-Jurassic extinction completed the transition from the Palaeozoic evolutionary fauna to the Modern evolutionary fauna, a change that began in the aftermath of the end-Guadalupian extinction and continued following the end-Permian extinction. Ammonites were affected substantially by the Triassic-Jurassic extinction. Ceratitidans, the most prominent group of ammonites in the Triassic, became extinct at the end of the Rhaetian after having their diversity reduced significantly in the Norian. Other ammonite groups such as the Ammonitina, Lytoceratina, and Phylloceratina diversified from the Early Jurassic onward. Bivalves experienced high extinction rates at the early and middle Rhaetian. File shell bivalves experienced the Brobdingnag effect, the reverse of the Lilliput effect, as a result of the mass extinction event. There is some evidence of a bivalve cosmopolitanism event in the aftermath of the mass extinction. Plankton and gastropod diversity was barely affected at the T-J boundary, although there may have been local extinctions in radiolarians. Brachiopods slowly declined in diversity during the late Triassic before re-diversifying in the Early Jurassic. Conulariids seemingly completely died out at the end of the Triassic. There is good evidence for a collapse in the reef community, as corals practically disappeared from the Tethys Ocean at the end of the Triassic and would not return to their previous abundance until the late Sinemurian (the 2nd of 11 Jurassic stages). This reef collapse was likely driven by ocean acidification resulting from  supplied to the atmosphere by the CAMP eruptions. Other studies point to a fast recovery from the mass extinction. British Early Jurassic benthic marine environments display a relatively rapid recovery that began almost immediately after the end of the mass extinction despite numerous relapses into anoxic conditions during the earliest Jurassic. Also despite recurrent anoxic episodes, large bivalves began to reappear shorty after the extinction event.

Marine vertebrates 

Fish did not suffer a mass extinction at the end of the Triassic. The late Triassic in general did experience a gradual drop in actinopterygiian diversity after an evolutionary explosion in the middle Triassic. Though this may have been due to falling sea levels or the Carnian pluvial event, it may instead be a result of sampling bias considering that middle Triassic fish have been more extensively studied than late Triassic fish. Despite the apparent drop in diversity, neopterygiians (which include most modern bony fish) suffered less than more "primitive" actinopterygiians, indicating a biological turnover where modern groups of fish started to supplant earlier groups. Conodonts, which were prominent index fossils throughout the Paleozoic and Triassic, finally became extinct at the T-J boundary following declining diversity.

Like fish, marine reptiles experienced a substantial drop in diversity between the middle Triassic and the Jurassic. However, their extinction rate at the Triassic–Jurassic boundary was not elevated. The highest extinction rates experienced by Mesozoic marine reptiles actually occurred at the end of the Ladinian stage, which corresponds to the end of the middle Triassic. The only marine reptile families which became extinct at or slightly before the Triassic–Jurassic boundary were the placochelyids (the last family of placodonts), and giant ichthyosaurs such as shastasaurids and shonisaurids. Nevertheless, some authors have argued that the end of the Triassic acted as a genetic "bottleneck" for ichthyosaurs, which never regained the level of anatomical diversity and disparity which they possessed during the Triassic.

Terrestrial vertebrates 

One of the earliest pieces of evidence for a late Triassic extinction was a major turnover in terrestrial tetrapods such as amphibians, reptiles, and synapsids. Edwin H. Colbert drew parallels between the system of extinction and adaptation between the Triassic–Jurassic and Cretaceous-Paleogene boundaries. He recognized how dinosaurs, lepidosaurs (lizards and their relatives), and crocodyliforms (crocodilians and their relatives) filled the niches of more ancient groups of amphibians and reptiles which were extinct by the start of the Jurassic. Olsen (1987) estimated that 42% of all terrestrial tetrapods became extinct at the end of the Triassic, based on his studies of faunal changes in the Newark Supergroup of eastern North America. More modern studies have debated whether the turnover in Triassic tetrapods was abrupt at the end of the Triassic, or instead more gradual.

During the Triassic, amphibians were mainly represented by large, crocodile-like members of the order Temnospondyli. Although the earliest lissamphibians (modern amphibians like frogs and salamanders) did appear during the Triassic, they would become more common in the Jurassic while the temnospondyls diminished in diversity past the Triassic–Jurassic boundary. Although the decline of temnospondyls did send shockwaves through freshwater ecosystems, it was probably not as abrupt as some authors have suggested. Brachyopoids, for example, survived until the Cretaceous according to new discoveries in the 1990s. Several temnospondyl groups did become extinct near the end of the Triassic despite earlier abundance, but it is uncertain how close their extinctions were to the end of the Triassic. The last known metoposaurids ("Apachesaurus") were from the Redonda Formation, which may have been early Rhaetian or late Norian. Gerrothorax, the last known plagiosaurid, has been found in rocks which are probably (but not certainly) Rhaetian, while a capitosaur humerus was found in Rhaetian-age deposits in 2018. Therefore, plagiosaurids and capitosaurs were likely victims of an extinction at the very end of the Triassic, while most other temnospondyls were already extinct.

Terrestrial reptile faunas were dominated by archosauromorphs during the Triassic, particularly phytosaurs and members of Pseudosuchia (the reptile lineage which leads to modern crocodilians). In the early Jurassic and onwards, dinosaurs and pterosaurs became the most common land reptiles, while small reptiles were mostly represented by lepidosauromorphs (such as lizards and tuatara relatives). Among pseudosuchians, only small crocodylomorphs did not become extinct by the end of the Triassic, with both dominant herbivorous subgroups (such as aetosaurs) and carnivorous ones (rauisuchids) having died out. Phytosaurs, drepanosaurs, trilophosaurids, tanystropheids, and procolophonids, which were other common reptiles in the late Triassic, had also become extinct by the start of the Jurassic. However, pinpointing the extinction of these different land reptile groups is difficult, as the last stage of the Triassic (the Rhaetian) and the first stage of the Jurassic (the Hettangian) each have few records of large land animals. Some paleontologists have considered only phytosaurs and procolophonids to have become extinct at the Triassic-Jurassic boundary, with other groups having become extinct earlier. However, it is likely that many other groups survived up until the boundary according to British fissure deposits from the Rhaetian. Aetosaurs, kuehneosaurids, drepanosaurs, thecodontosaurids, "saltoposuchids" (like Terrestrisuchus), trilophosaurids, and various non-crocodylomorph pseudosuchians are all examples of Rhaetian reptiles which may have become extinct at the Triassic-Jurassic boundary.

Terrestrial plants
The extinction event marks a floral turnover as well, although overall, plants suffered minor diversity losses on a global scale as a result of the extinction. Though spore turnovers are observed across the Triassic-Jurassic boundary, the abruptness of this transition and the relative abundances of given spore types both before and after the boundary are highly variable from one region to another, pointing to a global ecological restructuring rather than a mass extinction of plants. Evidence from Central Europe suggests that rather than a sharp, very rapid decline followed by an adaptive radiation, a more gradual turnover in both fossil plants and spores with several intermediate stages is observed over the course of the extinction event. The abundance of ferns in China that were resistant to high levels of aridity increased significantly across the Triassic-Jurassic boundary, whereas ferns better adapted for moist, humid environments declined, indicating that plants experienced major environmental stress, albeit not an outright mass extinction. In some regions, however, major floral extinctions did occur, with some researchers challenging the hypothesis of there being no significant floral mass extinction on this basis. In the Newark Supergroup of the United States East Coast, about 60% of the diverse monosaccate and bisaccate pollen assemblages disappear at the Tr–J boundary, indicating a major extinction of plant genera. Early Jurassic pollen assemblages are dominated by Corollina, a new genus that took advantage of the empty niches left by the extinction.

Possible causes

Gradual processes 
Gradual climate change, sea-level fluctuations, or a pulse of oceanic acidification during the late Triassic may have reached a tipping point. However, the effect of such processes on Triassic animal and plant groups is not well understood.

The extinctions at the end of the Triassic were initially attributed to gradually changing environments. Within his 1958 study recognizing biological turnover between the Triassic and Jurassic, Edwin H. Colbert's 1958 proposal was that this extinction was a result of geological processes decreasing the diversity of land biomes. He considered the Triassic period to be an era of the world experiencing a variety of environments, from towering highlands to arid deserts to tropical marshes. On the other hand, the Jurassic period was much more uniform both in climate and elevation due to excursions by shallow seas.

Later studies noted a clear trend towards increased aridification towards the end of the Triassic. Although high-latitude areas like Greenland and Australia actually became wetter, most of the world experienced more drastic changes in climate as indicated by geological evidence. This evidence includes an increase in carbonate and evaporite deposits (which are most abundant in dry climates) and a decrease in coal deposits (which primarily form in humid environments such as coal forests). In addition, the climate may have become much more seasonal, with long droughts interrupted by severe monsoons.

Geological formations in Europe seem to indicate a drop in sea levels in the late Triassic, and then a rise in the early Jurassic. Although falling sea levels have sometimes been considered a culprit for marine extinctions, evidence is inconclusive since many sea level drops in geological history are not correlated with increased extinctions. However, there is still some evidence that marine life was affected by secondary processes related to falling sea levels, such as decreased oxygenation (caused by sluggish circulation), or increased acidification. These processes do not seem to have been worldwide, with the sea level fall observed in European sediments believed to be not global but regional, but they may explain local extinctions in European marine fauna.

Extraterrestrial impact 

Some have hypothesized that an impact from an asteroid or comet may have caused the Triassic–Jurassic extinction, similar to the extraterrestrial object which was the main factor in the Cretaceous–Paleogene extinction about 66 million years ago, as evidenced by the Chicxulub crater in Mexico. However, so far no impact crater of sufficient size has been dated to precisely coincide with the Triassic–Jurassic boundary.

Nevertheless, the late Triassic did experience several impacts, including the second-largest confirmed impact in the Mesozoic. Olsen et al. (1987) were the first scientists to link the Manicouagan crater to the Triassic–Jurassic extinction, citing its age which at the time was roughly considered to be late Triassic. More precise radiometric dating by Hodych & Dunning (1992) has shown that the Manicouagan impact occurred about 214 million years ago, about 13 million years before the Triassic–Jurassic boundary. Therefore, it could not have been responsible for an extinction precisely at the Triassic–Jurassic boundary. Nevertheless, the Manicouagan impact did have a widespread effect on the planet; a 214-million-year-old ejecta blanket of shocked quartz has been found in rock layers as far away as England and Japan. There is still a possibility that the Manicouagan impact was responsible for a small extinction midway through the late Triassic at the Carnian–Norian boundary, although the disputed age of this boundary (and whether an extinction actually occurred in the first place) makes it difficult to correlate the impact with extinction. Onoue et al. (2016) alternatively proposed that the Manicouagan impact was responsible for a marine extinction in the middle of the Norian which affected radiolarians, sponges, conodonts, and Triassic ammonoids. Thus, the Manicouagan impact may have been partially responsible for the gradual decline in the latter two groups which culminated in their extinction at the Triassic–Jurassic boundary. The boundary between the Adamanian and Revueltian land vertebrate faunal zones, which involved extinctions and faunal changes in tetrapods and plants, was possibly also caused by the Manicouagan impact, although discrepancies between magnetochronological and isotopic dating lead to some uncertainty.

Other Triassic craters are closer to the Triassic–Jurassic boundary but also much smaller than the Manicouagan reservoir. Spray et al. (1998) noted an interesting phenomenon, that being how the Manicouagan, Rochechouart, and Saint Martin craters all seem to be at the same latitude, and that the Obolon' and Red Wing craters form parallel arcs with the Rochechouart and Saint Martin craters, respectively. Spray and his colleagues hypothesized that the Triassic experienced a "multiple impact event", a large fragmented asteroid or comet which broke up and impacted the earth in several places at the same time. Such an impact has been observed in the present day, when Comet Shoemaker-Levy 9 broke up and hit Jupiter in 1992. However, the "multiple impact event" hypothesis for Triassic impact craters has not been well-supported; Kent (1998) noted that the Manicouagan and Rochechouart craters were formed in eras of different magnetic polarity, and radiometric dating of the individual craters has shown that the impacts occurred millions of years apart.

Volcanic eruptions 

Massive volcanic eruptions, specifically the flood basalts of the Central Atlantic Magmatic Province (CAMP), would release carbon dioxide or sulfur dioxide and aerosols, which would cause either intense global warming (from the former) or cooling (from the latter). Before the end-Triassic extinction, carbon dioxide levels were around 1,000 ppm as measured by the stomatal index of Lepidopteris ottonis, but this quantity jumped to 1,300 ppm at the onset of the extinction event. The rate of carbon dioxide emissions was one of the most meteoric rises in carbon dioxide levels in Earth's entire history; the extreme severity of the mass extinction event can be attributed to the breakneck rate of CAMP carbon dioxide emissions as well as their humongous quantity. It is estimated that a single volcanic pulse from the large igneous province would have emitted an amount of carbon dioxide roughly equivalent to projected anthropogenic carbon dioxide emissions for the 21st century. The catastrophic dissociation of gas hydrates, which has been suggested as one possible cause of the largest mass extinction of all time, the so-called "Great Dying" at the end of the Permian period, may have exacerbated greenhouse conditions. In addition, the flood basalts intruded through sediments rich in organic matter, which led to the degassing of volatiles that further enhanced volcanic warming of the climate. Thermogenic carbon release through such contact metamorphism of carbon-rich deposits has been found to be a sensible hypothesis providing a coherent explanation for the magnitude of the negative carbon isotope excursions at the terminus of the Triassic. Besides the carbon dioxide-driven long-term global warming, CAMP volcanism had shorter term cooling effects resulting from sulphur dioxide emissions. A 2022 study shows that high latitudes had colder climates with evidence of mild glaciation. The authors propose that cold periods ("ice ages") induced by volcanic ejecta clouding the atmosphere might have favoured endothermic animals, with dinosaurs, pterosaurs, and mammals being more capable at enduring these conditions than large pseudosuchians due to insulation.

In addition to these climatic effects, oceanic uptake of volcanogenic carbon and sulphur dioxide would have led to a significant decrease of seawater pH known as ocean acidification, which is discussed as a relevant driver of marine extinction. Evidence for ocean acidification as an extinction mechanism comes from the preferential extinction of marine organisms with thick aragonitic skeletons and little biotic control of biocalcification (e.g., corals, hypercalcifying sponges). Global interruption of carbonate deposition at the Triassic-Jurassic boundary has been cited as additional evidence for catastrophic ocean acidification. The record of CAMP degassing shows several distinct pulses of carbon dioxide immediately following each major pulse of magmatism, at least two of which amount to a doubling of atmospheric CO2.

Anoxia was another mechanism of extinction; the end-Triassic extinction was coeval with an uptick in black shale deposition and a pronounced negative uranium isotope excursion, indicating a major decrease in marine oxygen availability. The persistence of anoxia into the Hettangian age may have helped delay the recovery of marine life in the extinction's aftermath.

The isotopic composition of fossil soils and marine sediments near the boundary between the Late Triassic and Early Jurassic has been tied to a large negative carbon isotope excursion. Carbon isotopes of hydrocarbons (n-alkanes) derived from leaf wax and lignin, and total organic carbon from two sections of lake sediments interbedded with the CAMP in eastern North America have shown carbon isotope excursions similar to those found in the mostly marine St. Audrie’s Bay section, Somerset, England; the correlation suggests that the end-Triassic extinction event began at the same time in marine and terrestrial environments, slightly before the oldest basalts in eastern North America but simultaneous with the eruption of the oldest flows in Morocco (Also suggested by Deenen et al., 2010), with both a critical  greenhouse and a  marine biocalcification crisis. Contemporaneous CAMP eruptions, mass extinction, and the carbon isotopic excursions are shown in the same places, making the case for a volcanic cause of a mass extinction. 

Some scientists initially rejected the volcanic eruption theory, because the Newark Supergroup, a section of rock in eastern North America that records the Triassic–Jurassic boundary, contains no ash-fall horizons and its oldest basalt flows were estimated to lie around 10 m above the transition zone. However, updated dating protocol and wider sampling has confirmed that the CAMP eruptions started in Nova Scotia and Morocco only a few thousand years before the extinction, and continued in several more pulses for the next 600,000 years.

References

Literature

 McHone, J.G. (2003), Volatile emissions of Central Atlantic Magmatic Province basalts: Mass assumptions and environmental consequences, in Hames, W.E. et al., eds., The Central Atlantic Magmatic Province: Insights from Fragments of Pangea. American Geophysical Union Monograph 136, p. 241-254.

External links
Theories on the Triassic–Jurassic Extinction
The Triassic–Jurassic Mass Extinction
200 million year old mystery BBC News story, 12-Oct-2011

 
Extinction events
.
.
Jurassic events
Triassic events
History of climate variability and change
Events that forced the climate
Evolutionary biology
.
.